Ramon Magsaysay Boulevard, also known simply as Magsaysay Boulevard and formerly as Santa Mesa Boulevard, is the principal artery of Santa Mesa in Manila, Philippines. It is a six-lane divided roadway that travels east–west from Gregorio Araneta Avenue near the city's border with Quezon City and San Juan to Lacson Avenue and the Nagtahan Interchange, close to the district of San Miguel. The entire length of the boulevard serves as the boundary between Sampaloc in the north and Santa Mesa in the south with the LRT Line 2 running along its median. East of Gregorio Araneta, the road continues as Aurora Boulevard while west of Lacson, it extends as Legarda Street via Legarda Flyover into San Miguel and Quiapo.
 
The LRT Line 2 has two stations along Magsaysay, namely Pureza and V. Mapa. It is also served by the Santa Mesa railway station near the Polytechnic University of the Philippines campus on Hipodromo and Anonas Streets.

The boulevard was named after the seventh president of the Philippines, Ramon Magsaysay. It was formerly called Santa Mesa Boulevard, which in turn was formerly called Calle Santa Mesa. It also formed part of Highway 53. The road now known as Old Santa Mesa Street was part of the original Calle Santa Mesa, up to the San Juan Bridge, wherein what is now the current alignment of Ramon Magsaysay Boulevard was later extended from Santol Street to Quezon City. Its present-day section between Nagtahan and Old Santa Mesa Road was also the former right-of-way of tranvia until 1945.

Route description

Magsaysay Boulevard is an all-divided road that starts as a continuation of Legarda Street past Lacson Avenue. The LRT Line 2 follows wholly the length of the road, with two stations, built above. The road has numerous traffic light intersections and side streets throughout its length. Various major establishments, like the Polytechnic University of the Philippines, Sogo Grand Hotel, and SM City Santa Mesa (formerly named SM Centerpoint), lie around or near the road.

Intersections

See also
 Major roads in Manila

References

Streets in Manila
Santa Mesa